The Southern Asia-Pacific Division (SSD) of Seventh-day Adventists is a sub-entity of the General Conference of Seventh-day Adventists, which coordinates the Church's activities in the nations of Bangladesh, Brunei, Burma, Cambodia, Indonesia, Laos, Malaysia, Pakistan, the Philippines, Singapore, Sri Lanka, Thailand, East Timor, and Vietnam. Its headquarters is in Silang, Cavite, Philippines. The Division has 1,695,552 members as of June 30, 2021

Sub Fields
The Southern Asia-Pacific Division is divided into four Union Conferences, five Union Missions, one Union Section, one Attached Conference and two Attached Missions. These are divided into local Conferences, Missions, Sections, Region & Attached Fields.

Bangladesh Union Mission
East Bangladesh Mission 
North Bangladesh Mission 
South Bangladesh Mission 
West Bangladesh Mission
Central Philippine Union Conference' 
Central Visayan Conference 
East Visayan Conference   
Negros Occidental Conference 
Negros Oriental-Siquijor Mission 
Romblon Mission 
Samar Mission
West Visayan Conference 
East Indonesia Union Conference
Bolaang Mongondow and Gorontalo Mission 
Central Sulawesi Mission 
Luwu Tana Toraja Mission 
Maluku Mission 
Manado and North Maluku Conference
Minahasa Conference 
North Minahasa Bitung Mission 
Northern Island Mission 
Papua Mission 
South Sulawesi Conference 
West Papua Mission
Malaysia Union Mission
Peninsular Malaysia Mission
Sabah Mission
Sarawak Mission
Myanmar Union Mission 
Ayeyarwady Mission 
Central Myanmar Mission 
South East Mission 
Upper Myanmar Mission 
Yangon Mission
North Philippine Union Conference 
Cavite Mission
Central Luzon Conference 
Mountain Provinces Mission 
Northeast Luzon Mission 
Northern Luzon Mission 
Palawan Mission 
South-Central Luzon Conference 
Southern Luzon Mission
Pakistan Union Section
Northern Section 
Southern Section
South Philippine Union Conference
Central Mindanao Mission
Davao Mission 
North Central Mindanao Conference 
Northeastern Mindanao Mission 
Northern Davao Mission
Southern Mindanao Mission 
Western Mindanao Conference 
Zamboanga Peninsula Mission
Southeast Asia Union Mission 
Cambodia Mission 
Thailand Mission 
Vietnam Mission  
Lao Mission 
West Indonesia Union Mission 
Central Java Mission 
Central Sumatra Mission 
East Java Conference 
East Kalimantan Mission 
Jakarta Conference 
North Sumatra Mission 
Nusa Tenggara Mission 
South Sumatra Mission 
West Java Conference 
West Kalimantan Region
Singapore Conference
Sri Lanka Mission 
Timor-Leste Mission

History

See also 
List of Seventh-day Adventist hospitals
List of Seventh-day Adventist secondary schools
List of Seventh-day Adventist colleges and universities
Seventh-day Adventist Church
Jombok Hoas a non-profit adventure retreat operated by Adventist Development and Relief Agency in Sry Tnong, Cambodia.
Wat Preah Yesu a children's orphanage, school & church in Siem Reap, Cambodia.

References

External links 

 Administrative realignment
 Seventh-day Adventist Church in Philippines Retrieved August 1, 2018

History of the Seventh-day Adventist Church
Organizations based in Cavite
Silang, Cavite
Seventh-day Adventist Church in Asia